Kavindu Ediriweera (born 8 July 1999) is a Sri Lankan cricketer. He made his List A debut on 16 December 2019, for Galle Cricket Club in the 2019–20 Invitation Limited Over Tournament. He made his Twenty20 debut on 4 January 2020, for Galle Cricket Club in the 2019–20 SLC Twenty20 Tournament. He made his first-class debut on 31 January 2020, for Galle Cricket Club in Tier B of the 2019–20 Premier League Tournament.

References

External links
 

1999 births
Living people
Sri Lankan cricketers
Galle Cricket Club cricketers
Cricketers from Galle